The Cadillac CTS is a luxury car that was manufactured and marketed by General Motors from 2003 until 2019 across three generations. Historically, it was priced similarly to cars on the compact luxury spectrum; but it has always been sized closely to its mid-size rivals. The third generation competes directly with the mid-size luxury cars. Initially available only as a 4-door sedan on the GM Sigma platform, GM had offered the second generation CTS in three body styles: 4-door sedan, 2-door coupe, and 5-door sport wagon also using the Sigma platform — and the third generation was offered only as a sedan, using a stretched version of the GM Alpha platform.

Wayne Cherry and Kip Wasenko designed the exterior of the first generation CTS, marking the production debut of a design language (marketed as "Art and Science") first seen on the Evoq concept car. Bob Boniface and Robin Krieg designed the exterior of the third generation CTS.

The CTS ended production in 2019 and was replaced by the CT5, which shared its platform with the third and final generation of the CTS in addition to the smaller CT4.

CTS-V 
The Cadillac CTS-V is a high-performance version of the Cadillac CTS.  The CTS-V series includes three body styles, all of which feature a pushrod OHV V-8 engine and a sport-tuned suspension. The four-door CTS-V sedan was introduced in 2004, and the CTS-V sport wagon and coupe were introduced in 2010 for the 2011 model year. The sedan competes in the North American consumer market against other high-performance luxury sedans and "echoes" their quality but is a more affordable option than competitors such as the Audi RS6, BMW M5, and Mercedes E63 AMG.

The second generation CTS-V sedan, coupe and station wagon was sold through 2014, concurrent with the third generation standard sedan, until the third generation CTS-V was ready. The car was discontinued and replaced by the CT5–V Blackwing in 2019.

First generation (2003) 

Introduced in January 2002 as a 2003 model, the CTS sedan was built on GM's new rear-wheel drive Sigma platform and sported a fully independent suspension. It was the first Cadillac to be offered with a manual transmission since the 1988 Cimarron. The CTS was designed as a replacement for the Opel-based Catera. (The acronym "CTS" stands for Catera Touring Sedan.) Wayne Cherry and Kip Wasenko designed the exterior of the first generation CTS and this vehicle marked the production debut of the "Art and Science" design language first seen on the Evoq concept car.  CTS vehicles are built at GM's Lansing Grand River Assembly in Lansing, Michigan.

The 3.2 L engine went out of production in 2005, when a new 2.8 L version of the DOHC V6 debuted in an entry-level version of the CTS. In Europe, the 2.8 L replaced the previous entry-level 2.6 L engine.

The CTS was originally offered with either GM's in-house five-speed 5L40-E automatic transmission or a five-speed Getrag 260 manual transmission. For the 2005 model year, the Getrag was replaced with an Aisin AY-6 six-speed.

In 2004, GM introduced the CTS-V, a high-performance version of the CTS intended to compete with luxury performance sedans like the BMW M3/M5, Audi S4/S6, and Mercedes-Benz C and E-class AMGs. The 2004 and 2005 CTS-Vs were equipped with the 5.7L LS6 V-8 ( at 6,000 rpm,  at 4,800 rpm), a Tremec T56 6-speed manual transmission, 14+" rotors and Brembo 4-piston calipers front and rear, suspension upgrades (higher spring rates, stiffer anti-roll bars, six-lug hubs, and two available damper packages), and subtle exterior changes. As the LS6 was phased out, the 2006 and 2007 CTS-Vs received the 6.0L LS2 V-8, which carried the same HP and torque ratings (with peak torque coming 400 rpm sooner).

A prototype first generation CTS station wagon was made but it was never put into production.

CTS-V (2004–2007)

Chassis

The first generation CTS-V is based on the same rear-wheel-drive GM Sigma platform as is the base model CTS. The use of a V8 engine required a unique engine cradle distinct from the base CTS V6. Larger anti-roll bars and larger shocks were also added.  The spring rate was significantly increased.  The 2006-2007 update also included a stronger rear differential and half shaft design. Unique front and rear treatments also included mesh grilles over the front openings, a track-ready suspension, six-lug hubs instead of the regular CTS's five-lug units, and 18×8.5 inch wheels inside of P245/45R18 Z-rated Goodyear Eagle F1 Supercar run-flat tires. Brakes were  rotors in the front, with  rotors in the rear - each with four-piston Brembo calipers on the front and rear wheels.  In addition, GM badges were added on 2006 models. For performance enthusiasts, a high performance suspension package (RPO FG2) was available as a dealer installed option.

Engine
The CTS sedan is enhanced with GM performance parts like a GM LS engine V8 from the C5-generation Chevrolet Corvette Z06, as well as the Corvette Z06's six-speed Tremec manual transmission gear ratios. The  torque reduction of the CTS-V vs the LS6 used in the C5 Z06, was due to the exhaust manifold that needed to be used on the CTS-V.  From 2006 to 2007, the previous LS6 engine was superseded by the new 6.0 L OHV LS2 engine as used in the base 2005 Chevrolet Corvette. While both engines offer the same HP and torque specifications, the LS2's benefit was a wider torque band, due to the  higher displacement it offered.

Transmission
The only available transmission was the six-speed manual Tremec T56.  The transmission used the skip-shift feature to conserve fuel during light loads by preventing drivers from using the second and third gears, and a dual mass flywheel to reduce "rattle" in no load conditions.  The rear axle was a Getrag limited slip IRS unit with a 3.73:1 ratio.

Performance
The first generation CTS-V also posted a lap time of 8 minutes 19 seconds at Germany's famed Nürburgring Nordschleife, competitive with rivals such as the Mercedes-Benz E55 AMG and BMW M5.

Second generation (2008) 

GM revealed the all-new 2008 CTS at the North American International Auto Show in January 2007. A 6-speed manual transmission was standard equipment on the second generation CTS and GM's 6-speed Hydra-matic 6L50 automatic transmission was available as an option on all variants. On-demand all-wheel drive was offered with both engines when equipped with an automatic transmission. Suspension, braking, and steering improvements from the previous generation CTS-V were designed into the new standard CTS.

Other changes included a revamped exterior, with a new, larger grille, slimmer headlights and taillights, side air extractor vents located forward of the front doors, and new nine-spoke 18-inch wheels, surrounding larger high-performance brake calipers and rotors. Available features on the second-gen CTS included a Bose 5.1 surround sound system, GM's Stabilitrak ESC system, a tire pressure monitoring system, a navigation system with real-time traffic and weather data, an integrated 40 GB hard drive for music storage, swiveling headlights, and remote starting.

In 2008, the General Motors chose the CTS to relaunch the Cadillac brand in Australia and New Zealand. However, in early 2009, amidst the global financial crisis, a last-minute decision was made not to go ahead with the Australian launch. As a result, the entire batch of cars, less one, which had already been shipped to Australia were transferred to New Zealand and sold via selected Holden New Zealand dealers. One dealer ended up buying the entire stock and owing to their popularity, sourced further UK market spec models while the model was still produced in RHD.

During the 2010 model year, the GM badges were dropped, although early 2010 models still had GM badges.

For the 2012 CTS, the front grille used higher quality materials to give a more vertical design, and the Cadillac logo was being subtly changed to give a more vibrant appearance. The biggest change was to the engine. Although kept the same 3.6-liter displacement, the V6 was able to produce  while dropping weight thanks to some modified engine internals. For 2012, GM also offered some new technology and option packages with the Cadillac CTS.

Coupe 

At the 2008 North American International Auto Show in Detroit, General Motors unveiled a coupe concept version of the CTS, alongside the new CTS-V performance sedan. The coupe's unveiling surprised the media and public, stealing a great deal of attention away from the CTS-V. In November 2009, the production version was unveiled in a press release. The coupe went into production in spring 2010 for sale in August 2010 as a 2011 model. The design of the production model is very similar to the concept, with the B-pillars still removed. The standard engine was a 3.6L direct injected V6 rated at 304 hp. Like the sedan, both six-speed manual and automatic transmissions, in either RWD or AWD configurations, were available. A CTS-V Coupe was introduced, first shown at the 2010 North American International Auto Show in Detroit.  The CTS Coupe was Cadillac's first coupe since the Eldorado, which was discontinued in 2002.  The CTS Coupe was discontinued after the 2014 model year, and the CTS-V Coupe discontinued after the 2015 model year.

Sport Wagon 

At the 2008 Pebble Beach Concours d'Elegance, Cadillac presented the 2010 CTS Sport Wagon. The wagon became available in late 2009 as a 2010 model. A CTS-V version was added for 2011.

The CTS Sport Wagon is available in either rear-wheel-drive or all-wheel-drive layouts, and is powered by either a 3.0-liter DOHC V6 engine or a 3.6-liter V6 with variable valve timing. The 3.0-liter engine produces , and the 3.6-liter produces .

With the third generation, Cadillac ceased production of the CTS wagon.

CTS-V (2009–2014)

The second generation CTS-V is based on the new GM Sigma II platform.  The rear-wheel-drive platform is the basis for the 2008 to present Cadillac CTS base model with which the CTS-V shares most of the body work.  The suspension features coil springs front and rear. The front suspension is a control arm arrangement while the rear is an independent multi-link suspension. To improve the handling and comfort, the 2009 CTS-V uses BWI Group's MagneRide technology. The dampers, filled with magnetorheological fluid, are adjusted based on sensor readings that happen at 1 ms intervals.  The sedan has four-wheel disc brakes similar to the first generation.  The front brakes were increased in size to  ventilated discs with six piston Brembo fixed calipers. The rear brakes are  ventilated rotors with four piston calipers.  Steering is speed-sensing hydraulic-assist rack-and-pinion.  The steering ratio is 16.1:1.  Tire sizes are 255/40ZR19 front and 285/35ZR19 rear on 19×9.0 inch and 19×9.5 inch wheels front and rear.

The 2009 CTS-V was added to the Car and Driver 10 Best Cars list.

Engine
The powerplant in the 2009 CTS-V is a supercharged  LSA V-8, based on the LS9 V-8 from the Chevrolet Corvette C6 ZR1. The choice to use a pushrod engine (OHV) arrangement is unique in the luxury performance sedan market where competitors typically use dual overhead camshaft (DOHC) engines. The engine is produced in GM's Silao, Guanajuato, Mexico engine assembly plant. The engine block is cast aluminium 319-T5 alloy with cast iron cylinder liners. The crankshaft is forged steel using powdered-metal connecting rods. Pistons are high-silicon Hypereutectic Aluminium alloy replacing the forged aluminum used in the LS9 engine. The compression ratio is 9.1:1. The cylinder heads are based on the Corvette's LS3 head and are cast from type 356-T6 Aluminum alloy. The exhaust manifolds are cast iron. The supercharger is a twin four-lobe screw compressor-type unit displacing . Intake air is cooled with a water-to-air intercooler built directly into the supercharger unit.

Transmissions
There are manual and automatic transmission choices.  The manual is a Tremec TR-6060 six-speed transmission with a short-throw shifter, twin disk clutch and dual-mass flywheel. The 6L90 automatic is a paddle shift conventional (planetary gearing and torque converter-based) automatic six-speed.

CTS-V sedan
Production of the CTS-V sedan began in the summer of 2008 in the Lansing, Michigan GM plant. Total production of the CTS-V for the 2009 model year was approximately 3,500 out of approximately 59,716 CTS model production.  The 2009 CTS-V has a base price of US$59,995, and was available for purchase as of November 1, 2008.

Standard features include: leather seats, lateral acceleration gauge, 19-inch aluminum alloy wheels, Michelin Pilot Sport PS2 tires, a built-in 40GB hard drive to store music, and LED flash tracers to tell the driver when to shift.

Options include polished wheels, sunroof, navigation system and, for the first time, Cadillac offers 14-way adjustable performance Recaro seats.

These numbers were duplicated by Road and Track magazine (0-60 mph in 3.9 seconds for the automatic and 4.1 seconds for the manual).

Coinciding with the release of General Motors' Viability Plan, the automaker has disbanded its High Performance Vehicle Operations team, the crew responsible for the line V-series Cadillacs, the Chevrolet Cobalt SS, the HHR SS, and the V8 version of the Colorado. According to Vince Muniga, a spokesman for GM, "All high-performance projects are on indefinite hold. The engineers are moving into different areas of the organization, and they will work on Cadillacs, Buicks, Chevrolets and Pontiacs." Muniga went on to say that there are no plans for high-performance versions of upcoming plans, but once GM is in a better financial position, the team could be reinstated.

For the 2010 model year, GM badges were dropped from near the doors, although earlier models still had the badges.

CTS-V Coupe

The CTS-V Coupe debuted at the 2010 North American International Auto Show in Detroit, and entered production in summer 2010 as a 2011 model.  It has the same  engine and transmission choices as the CTS-V sedan.  The CTS-V Coupe features unique centered twin exhausts, a larger grille for air intake, and an optional "saffron" interior trim color.  Like the CTS-V sedan, it comes standard with 19-inch aluminum wheels, Brembo brakes, and Magnetic Ride Control.

CTS-V Sport Wagon

When asked in 2009 about the possibility of a CTS-V wagon, the GM Vice Chairman at that time, Bob Lutz, replied, "... should sufficient demand materialize, there is no reason why we couldn't do a V-Series wagon, and I would be standing in line for one, just ahead of you." GM decided to move forward, introducing a 5-door sport wagon body style to the CTS-V vehicle line at the New York International Auto Show on March 29, 2010.

The CTS-V wagon shares the  engine and 6-speed manual or automatic transmission, Magnetic Ride Control, Brembo brakes, 19 inch aluminum wheels and performance tires and a dual-airflow grille also used in the CTS-V sedan and coupe.

Performance
General Motors states a 0- time of 3.9 seconds for the CTS-V Sedan and 4.0 seconds for the CTS-V Coupe and Wagon.

In May 2008, a 2009-model CTS-V sedan achieved a lap time of 7:59.32 at the Nürburgring Nordschleife, which was the fastest documented time for a production sedan on factory tires, until the Porsche Panamera Turbo clocked a time of 7:56 in July 2009. The vehicle was driven by John Heinricy during the attempt.
The record breaking vehicle was sold in 2009 at the Barrett-Jackson Palm Beach auction.

Third generation (2014)

On March 26, 2013, Cadillac unveiled the third generation of the CTS. The twin turbocharged engine is only available in the CTS Vsport, a new trim that serves as a step between the 3.6L V6 and the high-performance CTS-V.

Despite carrying the CTS name, the third generation model is actually closer in size and market position to the former STS.

Design
Bob Boniface and Robin Krieg designed the exterior of the third generation CTS. Eric Clough designed the interior.

Production
General Motors began assembling 2014 CTS sedans intended for sale to customers on September 16, 2013. Sales began in October 2013.

Reception
Motor Trend named the third-generation CTS its 2014 Car of the Year. As customary with award winners, the magazine acquired a CTS (in Vsport trim) for a long-term test. Its verdict lauded the car's driving dynamics and reliability but criticized its CUE multi-media interface.

In a four-way comparison in the December 2013 issue of Car and Driver the 2014 CTS 3.6 placed second overall. The article praised the handling of the CTS stating "[The CTS] is the only car in this group that didn't just put up with hard driving, it indeed goaded its driver to go faster." and praised the stopping ability, stiff structure and light weight of the car. The article criticized the engine for being "coarse in the upper ranges", the acceleration times, the fuel economy and the CUE entertainment system.

Sales concerns led Cadillac to offer rebates to the 2014 models and lower sticker prices on the 2015 models.

Powertrains
All engines available in the 2014 CTS are constructed from cast aluminum blocks and heads and use direct injection and variable valve timing.

For the 2016 model year, the 6-speed 6L45 automatic transmission was replaced by the new 8-speed 8L45 automatic transmission, with the 8L45 also taking over duties with the naturally aspirated 3.6L V6 from the 8-speed Aisin TL-80SN automatic transmission.  V-Sport models will continue to use the 8-speed Aisin TL-80SN. A new 3.6L V6, the LGX, replaced the 3.6L V6 LFX.

CTS-V (2016–2019)

It weighs . The new 2016 Cadillac CTS-V model equipped with an 8-speed automatic transmission has been street tested with a best 0- test time of 3.5 seconds.

The CTS and CTS-V were discontinued after the 2019 model year; a new model, the CT5, built on an Alpha 2 platform, was scheduled to replace the CTS, and would also include a CT5 V series. Production ended in early 2019.

Awards 
In its first year of production, the first-generation CTS was nominated for the 2002 North American Car of the Year award. The gen-2 CTS/CTS-V won MotorWeek's Driver's Choice Awards for "Best Sport Sedan" in 2008 and 2009. The second-generation CTS won the 2008 Motor Trend Car of the Year award and was chosen as one of Car and Driver's 10Best cars.

In 2009, the second-generation CTS and CTS-V were chosen for the Car and Driver 10Best list, making the CTS the first Cadillac to be chosen twice in consecutive years. In 2010, the second-generation CTS and CTS-V returned to the Car and Driver 10Best list under the sub-headline "Maybe the best American car ever made". The CTS-V made the Car and Driver 10Best list again in 2011 and 2012.

The third-generation CTS won the 2014 Motor Trend Car of the Year award and was named to the Car and Driver 10Best list.  Also in 2014, the CTS ranked number one among Upscale Midsize Cars according to U.S. News & World Report.

Marketing 
The success of the CTS has been attributed in part to the car's placement in the 2003 sci-fi action film The Matrix Reloaded. The producers of the film were seeking a car that would complement the film's atmosphere. General Motors suggested the then-unreleased CTS to the filmmakers, who accepted; ten prototypes damaged to different extents were used to represent the film's hero car, a silver CTS.

Motorsports 

The CTS-V is raced in the SCCA World Challenge series. The first generation CTS-V sedan competed from 2004 to 2007, winning the manufacturer's championship in 2005 and 2007. Starting in 2011 the second generation V competed as a coupe, winning Cadillac back-to-back manufacturer's championships in 2012 and 2013. The 2011 coupe race car is built by Pratt & Miller. For the 2015 season, the CTS-V was replaced by the Cadillac ATS-V.

Production and sales 

Total combined sales of all Cadillac CTS models by year.

CTS-V Production by model year

References

External links 

 
 
 

CTS
All-wheel-drive vehicles
Mid-size cars
Executive cars
Rear-wheel-drive vehicles
Coupés
Sports sedans
Vehicles built in Lansing, Michigan
Cars introduced in 2002
Motor vehicles manufactured in the United States
2010s cars